Protocadherin Fat 4, also known as cadherin family member 14 (CDHF14) or FAT tumor suppressor homolog 4 (FAT4), is a protein that in humans is encoded by the FAT4 gene.

FAT4 is associated with the Hippo signaling pathway.

Clinical significance 
Mutations in FAT4 are associated to Hennekam syndrome.

References

Further reading